Roswell Mears Austin (September 23, 1887 – February 1, 1966) was a Vermont politician and attorney who served as Speaker of the Vermont House of Representatives. He was the brother of United States Senator Warren R. Austin.

Biography 
Roswell Mears Austin was born in Highgate, Vermont on September 23, 1887. He graduated from Yale University, studied law and began a practice in St. Albans.

A Republican, Austin was Assistant Clerk of the Vermont House of Representatives from 1915 to 1920 and Clerk from 1921 to 1925.

In 1924 Austin was elected to the Vermont House of Representatives. He served one term, 1925 to 1927, and was Speaker of the House.

Austin later became involved in several businesses, and was a longtime executive of the American Granite Association.

Roswell Austin was also active in the Army Reserve, and attained the rank of lieutenant colonel.

In the 1940s and 1950s Austin was a member of the U.S. Armed Services Board of Contract Appeals, and he served as the board's president. As a result of this service, he was involved in the investigation of President Dwight Eisenhower's Chief of Staff, Sherman Adams when Adams was accused of using his influence on behalf of favored contractors in exchange for gifts.

Austin died in New Bern, North Carolina on February 1, 1966.  He was cremated in Durham, North Carolina.

References 

1887 births
1966 deaths
People from St. Albans, Vermont
Speakers of the Vermont House of Representatives
Republican Party members of the Vermont House of Representatives
Vermont lawyers
Yale University alumni
Politicians from New Bern, North Carolina
20th-century American politicians
20th-century American lawyers